The Société nationale de musique was an organisation in late 19th and early 20th century Paris, promoting French music and allowing rising composers to present their works in public. It was founded in the aftermath of France's defeat in the Franco-Prussian War of 1870–71 on a strong tide of nationalist feeling, and at first excluded all music by non-French composers. In its first 30 years it gave the premieres of works by composers including Saint-Saëns, Chabrier, Franck, Fauré, Dukas and Debussy.

In the 1880s the original purely French nature of the society was abandoned, and foreign works and composers were accepted. Under the presidency of Vincent d'Indy the society became increasingly conservative, and a rival organisation, the Société musicale indépendante, was set up in 1910 by Maurice Ravel and others, briefly overshadowing the Société nationale. The rival closed down in 1935; the Société nationale continued until 1939 when it was wound up.

Among the works written for or premiered by the society are Chabrier's Pièces pittoresques, Franck's Variations symphoniques, Fauré's First and Second Piano Quartets and the song-cycle La Bonne chanson, Dukas's L'Apprenti sorcier, and Debussy's String Quartet and  Prélude à l'après-midi d'un faune.

History

Foundation
The society was founded during the Franco-Prussian War of 1870–71. In the brief lull between the ending of the siege of Paris and the rise and fall of the Paris Commune, a group of French musicians met on 25 February 1871 to agree how to promote French music. Before this, French concert halls were dominated by the German symphonic and chamber repertoire; for example, at the popular Pasdeloup concerts between 1861 and 1873, Berlioz  and Gounod were programmed 31 times each, and Saint-Saëns 12, compared to 43 performances of Wagner's music and 350 of Beethoven's. A wave of anti-German and nationalist sentiments that arose in the wake of the French defeat made the dominance of German music intolerable to many.

The moving forces behind the new society were  Romain Bussine, professor of singing at the Paris Conservatoire and the composer Camille Saint-Saëns. An executive committee was formed and had its first meeting on 17 March at Bussine's house in the rue Chabanais. Bussine was president, Ernest Reyer vice-president (replaced by Saint-Saëns shortly afterwards), Alexis de Castillon secretary and Jules Garcin assistant secretary. Founding members of the society included Théodore Dubois, Henri Duparc,  Gabriel Fauré, César Franck, Ernest Guiraud, Jules Massenet, and Paul Taffanel. Their nationalist principles were explicit in the constitution, drafted by Castillon:

A biographer of Franck has written "They were determined to unite in their efforts to spread the gospel of French music and to make known the works of living French composers". Another clause in the constitution laid down, "No one can be part of the Society as an active member, unless he is French". The society adopted the Latin motto "Ars Gallica" – French Art. 

The day after the inaugural meeting of the committee of the new society, an insurrection in Paris led to the establishment and subsequent bloody suppression of the Paris Commune, and musical matters were temporarily abandoned. When peace was restored the society staged its first concert. It took place on 17 November 1871 at the Salle Pleyel in the rue de Richelieu, and featured the Trio in B major by Franck, two songs by Dubois, Five Pieces in Ancient Style by Castillon, a reduction of the Violin Concerto by Garcin, an Improvisation for tenor by Massenet, and the Caprice héroïque for two pianos by Saint-Saëns, played by the composer and Fauré.

Development
The society leaned heavily towards chamber music and away from opera. Fauré later recalled:

Almost from the outset the society attracted about 150 members. Among those who joined after the founding members were Georges Bizet, Louis-Albert Bourgault-Ducoudray, Vincent d'Indy, Edouard Lalo, Charles Lenepveu and Charles-Marie Widor. The organisers would have liked to present their early concerts with an orchestra, but finances did not permit it, and they made do with pianos. In a study of the Parisian musical scene of the time, Elaine Brody writes that composers came to meetings prepared to offer their own compositions or to accompany singers who performed their mélodies, and that this set the society's concerts apart from routine concerts. In the early years, concerts were for members only, but in an attempt to increase the society's income and enable it to pay for orchestras, tickets were later made available to the general public.

In a survey of the society's work, Alain Cochart lists some of the well-known works premiered by or written for it in its first thirty years. Chabrier's Pièces pittoresques (1881) and Bourrée fantasque (1893); Franck's Piano Quintet (1880), Prélude, Choral and Fugue (1885), Variations symphoniques (1886) and String Quartet (1890); Fauré's Violin Sonata No. 1 (1877) and Piano Quartets Nos 1 and 2 (1880 and 1887); Cinq mélodies "de Venise" (1892) and La Bonne chanson (1895); Chausson's Symphony (1891); Dukas's L'Apprenti sorcier (1897); and Debussy's String Quartet (1893), Prélude à l'après-midi d'un faune (1894) and Pour le piano (1902).

Later years and legacy

In 1885 d'Indy was appointed joint secretary of the society. His ambition was to open up the society to non-French music and musicians. As a protégé of Franck he worked with his former teacher to establish a faction for change in the society. In 1886 he achieved his aims and Saint-Saëns and Bussine resigned. The first foreign composer whose work the society presented was Edvard Grieg. Franck refused the official title of president of the society, but when he died in 1890 d'Indy took the post. Under him, the new generation of French composers found the society increasingly conservative and less helpful to composers who did not follow the dogmatic compositional precepts taught by d'Indy at his music school, the Schola Cantorum de Paris. 

In 1910 a group of young French composers led by Maurice Ravel rebelled, and set up a rival organisation, the Société musicale indépendante (SMI). They secured Fauré as their president, and for a while outshone the older body, attracting composers including Béla Bartók, Manuel de Falla, Arnold Schoenberg, Igor Stravinsky and Anton Webern. During the First World War strong attempts were made to bring the old and new societies together. D'Indy stood down as president of the Société nationale to allow his old friend Fauré to become president of both organisations in readiness for the merger, but the younger elements of the SMI were not reconciled with the old guard, and the proposal foundered. The two organisations continued to function separately until the SMI was wound up in 1935, after giving 171 concerts in its 25 years of existence. In the inter-war years the Société nationale presented new works by composers including Arthur Honegger, Francis Poulenc, Bohuslav Martinů and less well-known composers including Henri Lutz, Marcel Pollet, Marcel Lubey and Déodat de Séverac. The society's existence came to an end in 1939, under its last president, Florent Schmitt.

In the early 20th century Romain Rolland wrote:

Notes, references and sources

Notes

References

Sources

Books

Web

French music
Music organizations based in France